The Silurian-Devonian Terrestrial Revolution, also known as the Devonian Plant Explosion (DePE) and the Devonian explosion, was a period of rapid plant and fungal diversification that occurred 428 to 359 million years ago during the Silurian and Devonian, with the most critical phase occurring during the Late Silurian and Early Devonian. This diversification of terrestrial plant life had vast impacts on the biotic composition of earth's soil, its atmosphere, its oceans, and for all plant and animal life that would follow it. Through fierce competition for light and available space on land, phenotypic diversity of plants increased greatly, comparable in scale and effect to the explosion in diversity of animal life during the Cambrian explosion, especially in vertical plant growth, which allowed for photoautotrophic canopies to develop, and forever altering plant evolutionary floras that followed. As plants evolved and radiated, so too did arthropods, which formed symbiotic relationships with them. This Silurian and Devonian flora was significantly different in appearance, reproduction, and anatomy to most modern flora. Much of this flora had died out in extinction events including the Kellwasser Event, the Hangenberg Event, the Carboniferous Rainforest Collapse, and the End-Permian Extinction.

Silurian and Devonian life 
Rather than plants, it was fungi, in particular nematophytes such as Prototaxites, that dominated the early stages of this terrestrial biodiversification event. Nematophytes towered over even the largest land plants during the Silurian and Early Devonian, only being truly surpassed in size in the Early Carboniferous. The nutrient-distributing glomeromycotan mycorrhizal networks of nematophytes were very likely to have acted as facilitators for the expansion of plants into terrestrial environments, which followed the colonising fungi. The first fossils of arbuscular mycorrhizae, a type of symbiosis between fungi and vascular plants, are known from the Early Devonian.

Land plants probably evolved in the Ordovician. The earliest radiations of the first land plants, also known as embryophytes, were bryophytes, which began to transform terrestrial environments and the global climate in the Ordovician. The end of the Homerian glaciation, a glacial phase of the Early Palaeozoic Ice Age, and the corresponding period of global warming marked the first major diversification of plants that produced trilete spores. The later glaciation during the middle Ludfordian, corresponding to the Lau event, led to a major marine regression, creating significant areas of new dry land habitat that were colonised by plants, along with cyanobacterial mats. These newly created terrestrial habitats helped facilitate the global expansion and evolutionary radiation of polysporangiophytes. A warming climate during the subsequent Pridoli epoch lent itself to further floral diversification. During the Wenlock epoch of the Silurian, the first fossils of vascular plants appear in the fossil record in the form of sporophytes of polysporangiophytes. Clubmosses first appeared during the later Ludlow epoch. Palynological evidence points to Silurian terrestrial floras exhibiting little provincialism relative to present day floras that vary significantly by region, instead being broadly similar across the globe. Plant diversification in the Silurian was aided by the presence of numerous small, rapidly changing volcanic islands in the Rheic Ocean that acted as natural laboratories accelerating evolutionary changes and enabling distinct, endemic floral lineages to arise. Silurian plants rarely reached large sizes, with heights of 13 cm, achieved by Tichavekia grandis, being exceptionally large for the time.

The Devonian witnessed the widespread greening of the Earth's surface, with many modern vascular plant clades originating during this period. Basal members of Euphyllophytina, the clade that includes trimerophytes, ferns, progymnosperms, and seed plants, are known from Early Devonian fossils. Lycopsids experienced their first evolutionary radiation during the Devonian period. 

The first true forest environments featuring trees exceeding eight metres in height emerged by the Middle Devonian. The oldest known trees were members of the clade Cladoxylopsida. Devonian swamp forests were dominated by giant horsetails (Equisetales), clubmosses, ancestral ferns (pteridophytes), and large lycophyte vascular plants such as Lepidodendrales, referred to as scale trees for the appearance of scales on their photosynthetic trunks. These lycophytes, which could grow up to 40 metres high, grew in great numbers around swamps along with tracheophytes. Seed ferns and true leaf-bearing plants such as progymnosperms also appeared at this time and became dominant in many habitats, particularly archeopteridaleans, which were likely related to conifers. Pseudosporochnaleans (related to palms and tree ferns) likewise experienced a similar rise to dominance. Archeopteridaleans had likely developed extensive root systems, making them resistant to drought, and meaning they had a more significant impact on Devonian soil environments than pseudosporochnaleans. 

Cladoxylopsids continued to dominate forest ecosystems during the early Late Devonian. During the latest Devonian, the first true spermatophytes appeared, evolving as a sister group to archaeopteridaleans or to progymnosperms as a whole. 

Most flora in Devonian coal swamps would have seemed alien in appearance when compared with modern flora, such as giant horsetails which could grow up to 30 m in height. Devonian ancestral plants of modern plants that may have been very similar in appearance are ferns (Polypodiopsida), although many of them are thought to have been epiphytes rather than grounded plants. True gymnosperms like ginkgos (Ginkgophyta) and cycads (Cycadophyta) would appear slightly after the Devonian in the Carboniferous.

Vascular plant lineages of sphenoids, fern, progymnosperms, and seed plants evolved laminated leaves during the Devonian. Plants that possessed true leaves appeared during the Devonian, though they may have many independent origins with parallel trajectories of leaf morphologies. Morphological evidence to support this diversification theory appears in the Late Devonian or Early Carboniferous when compared with modern leaf morphologies. The marginal meristem also evolved in a parallel fashion through a similar process of modified structures around this time period. In a 1994 study by Richard M Bateman and William A. Dimechele of the evolutionary history of heterospory in the plant kingdom, researchers found evidence of 11 origins of heterospory events that had occurred independently in the Devonian within Zosterophyllopsida, Sphenopsida, Progymnospermopsida. The effect of this heterospory was that it presented a primary evolutionary advantage for these plants in colonizing land. The simultaneous colonization of dry land and increase in plant body size that many lineages underwent during this time was likely facilitated by another parallel development: the replacement of the ancestral central cylinder of xylem with more elongate, complex xylem strand shapes that would have made the plant body more resistant to the spread of drought-induced embolism. Tracheids, tapered cells that make up the xylem of vascular plants, first appear in the fossil record during the Early Devonian. Woody stems evolved during the Devonian as well, with the first evidence of them dating back to the Early Devonian. Root structures appear for the first time in the fossil record in Early Devonian lycophytes, and it has been suggested that the development of roots was an adaptation for maximising water acquisition in response to the increase in aridity over the course of the Silurian and Devonian. The Early Devonian also saw the appearance of complex subterranean rhizome networks.

Effect on atmosphere, soil, and climate 
Deep-rooted vascular plants had drastic impacts upon soil, atmosphere, and oceanic oxygen composition. The Devonian Plant Hypothesis is an explanation about these effects upon biogeomorphic ecosystems of climate and marine environments. A climate/carbon/vegetation model could explain the effects of plant colonization during the Devonian. Land plant expansion of Devonian flora modified soil properties and there is evidence that atmospheric  levels fell from around 6300 to 2100 ppmv as a result of carbon sequestration by land plants, while oxygen levels rose as a direct result of plant expansion. By the latest Famennian, oxygen levels were high enough to enable wildfires to occur with regularity, something which had not been previously possible due to the paucity of atmospheric oxygen. The biological sequestration of so much carbon dioxide resulted in the beginning of the Late Palaeozoic Ice Age at the terminus of the Devonian.

The Devonian explosion had global consequences on oceanic nutrient content and sediment cycling, which had led to the Devonian mass extinction. The expansion of trees in the Late Devonian drastically increased biological weathering rates and the consequent riverine input of nutrients into the ocean. The altering of soil composition created anoxic sedimentation (or black shales), oceanic acidification, and global climate changes. This led to harsh living conditions for oceanic and terrestrial life.

The increase in terrestrial plant matter in swamplands explains the deposits of coal and oil that would later characterize the Carboniferous.

References 

Silurian life
Devonian life
Evolution of plants